Pierre Maline  (b. 1883 –d.1934) in Mirecourt (Vosges) was a luthier and an archetier / bow maker.

Son of François Alexandre MALINE (1862-1922) a bow maker, who was the nephew of Nicolas Maline ("One of history's important bowmakers."). 

Pierre  Maline (grandnephew of  Nicolas Maline) apprenticed first with his father before joining CUNIOT HURY's workshop.
After his apprenticeship he returned to his father's workshop in Mirecourt where he stayed for the rest of his career (as well as his life).

His work is quite rare. Many of his bows were stamped PIERRE MALINE. 
Some of his production can be found unsigned or bearing the stamp of other violin & / or bow makers.

References

Further reading
 
 
 
 

1883 births
1934 deaths
Luthiers from Mirecourt
Bow makers
19th-century French people